Taraznahid (also Romanized as Ţarāznāhīd and Ţarāz-e Nāhīd; also known as Ţarāz-e Nā’īn and Tarāznāīn) is a village in Taraznahid Rural District, in the Central District of Saveh County, Markazi Province, Iran. At the 2006 census, its population was 2,391, in 590 families.

References 

Populated places in Saveh County